Gregory Dickow is the founder and senior pastor of Life Changers International Church, a nondenominational charismatic megachurch based in Hoffman Estates, Illinois. His messages are broadcast via The Power to Change Today, a syndicated television program which airs around the world on Trinity Broadcasting Network, Daystar, The Church Channel, and Word Networks.

Early life 

Gregory Michael Dickow was born on September 18, 1964, to Robert and Farial of Detroit, Michigan.  His complete profile was reported through The 700 Club,
aired by the Christian Broadcasting Network.

Dickow attended college at Western Michigan University in Kalamazoo and graduated with a communications degree in 1986. He was a member of the Maranatha Campus Ministries.

Ministry 

In 1992, Gregory Dickow started Life Changers International Church, a multicultural faith church. It was incorporated in 1993. The church opened its Barrington Hills campus in September 1996.

The Life Changers downtown Chicago satellite campus began in 1998. Dickow's television ministry started in 1998.  In the fall of 2004, he opened a new ministry world headquarters in Hoffman Estates, a 160,000 square-foot facility located on 30 acres, incorporating a sanctuary, prayer center, gymnasium, and radio and TV studio. The campus also houses the Valeo Academy, a K-12 Christian school.  The school started in 2004 and is now part of the Association of Christian Schools International.

Dickow also started the Ask the Pastor radio show in 2005, airing live for an hour daily.

Books Written by Gregory Dickow 

– Breaking The Power of Inferiority
– Changed By Love
– Conquering Your Flesh
– Faith For Your Family Declarations
– Fast From Wrong Thinking: 40-Day Devotional*
– Fearless: How to Conquer Fear Forever
– How to Fulfill God's Purpose for Your Life
– How to Hear the Voice of God Today
– How to Never Be Hurt Again
– More Than Amazing Grace
– Precious Promises of the Blood of Jesus
– Silencing the Accuser: The Power of a Guilt-Free Life
– So Loved*
– Soul Cure
– Taking Charge Of Your Emotions
– The Power of a New Life* 
– The Power to Change Today: Simple Secrets to the Satisfied Life
– The Promises Of Hope
– Triumphing Over Loneliness
– 30 Days of Rest: Pearls of Pure Grace
– 30 Days of Blessing

Book is published in Spanish and English

References

External links 
 Gregory Dickow Website
 Life Changers International Church

1964 births
American Christian writers
American male journalists
Living people
Clergy from Detroit
People from Michigan